The Prince of Anhua rebellion or Prince Anhua uprising was a rebellion by Zhu Zhifan, Prince of Anhua and member of the House of Zhu, against the reign of the Zhengde Emperor from 12 May 1510 to 30 May 1510. The Prince of Anhua revolt was one of two princedom rebellions during Zhengde's rule as emperor of the Ming dynasty, and precedes the Prince of Ning rebellion in 1519.

Background 
The eunuch Liu Jin rose to power during the ascension of the Zhengde Emperor. He initiated a series of tax reforms to increase state revenues. In 1492, Zhu Zhifan inherited the title of Prince of Anhua, a princedom located in modern Shaanxi. Zhu desired the imperial throne, and surrounded himself with a group of loyal supporters. 

A team of officials was sent to Ningxia in March 1510 to enforce the new military tax rates introduced by Liu Jin. The order issued to punish tax evaders was resented by the soldiers garrisoned at Ningxia. Sensing the opportunity, Zhu began plotting his rebellion with disgruntled officers.

Rebellion 
The officials of Ningxia were invited to a banquet hosted by the Prince on the night of 12 May 1510. As they were drinking, rebel soldiers entered the court and massacred the guests, initiating the rebellion. The day afterward, soldiers were also sent out to kill or arrest the officials who had refused to attend. Prince Zhu also issued imperial edicts and commands declaring his raison d'être to boost support for his rebellion. He criticized the corruption of Liu Jin and claimed that his rebellion would oust Liu Jin from power. Under the influence of Liu Jin, regional commanders ignored Zhu's request for reinforcements and Zhu's edicts never reached the imperial court.

The first major battle of the rebellion occurred on 21 May between two hundred imperial soldiers accompanied by archers and rebels guarding boats on the Yellow River. The rebels were defeated and the soldiers captured the rebel boats and weapons. The military officer Qiu Yue had joined the rebellion out of fear for his family who still resided in Ningxia. Qiu offered his troops to Zhu, but secretly assembled an army of men still loyal to the Zhengde Emperor while feigning illness to avoid directly assisting Zhu. Qiu purposefully misled Zhu by offering disinformation on the movements of imperial troops. With a hundred men, Qiu's forces killed many of Zhu's supporters in the Prince's court. The rebellion ended with the capture of Zhu on 30 May 1510.

Aftermath 
News of Zhu's capture spread and the remaining rebels fled or were killed by loyalist soldiers. After a long period of captivity, Zhu was allowed to kill himself to avoid execution on 14 March 1511. Zhu's sons lost their imperial titles, and monetary and material awards were given to those who had helped to suppress the rebellion. The official, Yang Yiqing, was sent to the area with the eunuch and military inspector, Zhang Yong, to defeat the rebels, but arrived after the uprising had already ended. While they returned to the capital with the captured Zhu, they conspired to blame the rebellion on Liu Jin, whom they felt was a threat. Liu Jin was arrested on 16 September 1510 and was executed by slow slicing on 27 September.

References

Rebellions in the Ming dynasty
Conflicts in 1510
16th century in China
1510 in China
Rebellious princes